As well as his work with Queen, Freddie Mercury released two solo albums and several singles. Although his solo work was not as commercially successful as most Queen albums, the two off-Queen albums and several of the singles debuted in the top 10 of the UK Music Charts. Following Mercury's death in 1991, several posthumous box sets and compilation albums have been released. 

Mercury's first solo effort goes back to 1972 under the pseudonym Larry Lurex, when Trident Studios' house engineer Robin Geoffrey Cable was working in a musical project, at the time when Queen were recording their debut album; Cable enlisted Mercury to perform lead vocals on the songs "I Can Hear Music" and "Goin' Back", both were released together as a single in 1973. Eleven years later, Mercury contributed to the soundtrack for the restoration of the 1927 Fritz Lang film Metropolis. The song "Love Kills" was written for the film by Giorgio Moroder in collaboration with Mercury, and produced by Moroder and Mack; in 1984 it debuted at the number 10 position in the UK Singles Chart.

Mercury's two full albums outside the band were Mr. Bad Guy (1985) and Barcelona (1988). His first album, Mr. Bad Guy, debuted in the top ten of the UK Album Charts. In 1993, a remix of "Living on My Own", a single from the album, posthumously reached number one on the UK Singles Charts. The song also garnered Mercury a posthumous Ivor Novello Award from the British Academy of Songwriters, Composers and Authors. AllMusic critic Eduardo Rivadavia describes Mr. Bad Guy as "outstanding from start to finish" and expressed his view that Mercury "did a commendable job of stretching into uncharted territory". In particular, the album is heavily synthesiser-driven; that is not characteristic of previous Queen albums.

His second album, Barcelona, recorded with Spanish soprano vocalist Montserrat Caballé, combines elements of popular music and opera. Many critics were uncertain what to make of the album; one referred to it as "the most bizarre CD of the year". The album was a commercial success, and the album's title track debuted at No. 8 in the UK and was also a hit in Spain. The title track received massive airplay as the official anthem of the 1992 Summer Olympics (held in Barcelona one year after Mercury's death). Caballé sang it live at the opening of the Olympics with Mercury's part played on a screen, and again before the start of the 1999 UEFA Champions League Final between Manchester United and Bayern Munich in Barcelona.

In addition to the two solo albums, Mercury released several singles, including his own version of the hit "The Great Pretender" by the Platters, which debuted at No. 5 in the UK in 1987. In September 2006 a compilation album featuring Mercury's solo work was released in the UK in honour of what would have been his 60th birthday. The album debuted in the UK top 10. In 2012, Freddie Mercury: The Great Pretender, a documentary film directed by Rhys Thomas on Mercury's attempts to forge a solo career, premiered on BBC One.

In 1981–1983 Mercury recorded several tracks with Michael Jackson, including a demo of "State of Shock", "Victory", and "There Must Be More to Life Than This". None of these collaborations were officially released at the time, although bootleg recordings exist. Jackson went on to record the single "State of Shock" with Mick Jagger for the Jacksons' album Victory. Mercury included the solo version of "There Must Be More To Life Than This" on his Mr. Bad Guy album. "There Must Be More to Life Than This" was eventually reworked by Queen and released on their compilation album Queen Forever in 2014. In addition to working with Michael Jackson, Mercury and Roger Taylorsang on the title track for Billy Squier's 1982 studio release, Emotions in Motion and later contributed to two tracks on Squier's 1986 release, Enough Is Enough, providing vocals on "Love is the Hero" and musical arrangements on "Lady With a Tenor Sax". In 2020, Mercury's music video for "Love Me Like There's No Tomorrow" was nominated for Best Animation at the Berlin Music Video Awards. Woodlock studio is behind the animation.

Albums

Studio albums

Barcelona 1992 chart position. It originally charted at number 25 in the UK in 1988.

Compilation albums

Box sets

Singles

Collaborations and guest appearances
1975: All four members of Queen helped produce a session with the soul band Trax. Nothing was ever released.
1976: "Man from Manhattan" by Eddie Howell – Mercury sang backing vocals, played piano and produced this track. Brian May also played guitar.
1976: "You Nearly Did Me In" by Ian Hunter – Mercury sang backing vocals on this song, from the album All-American Alien Boy.
1978: "Never Let Her Slip Away", a UK top five hit for Andrew Gold, saw Mercury perform harmony vocals as an uncredited background singer.
1982: "Emotions in Motion" by Billy Squier – Mercury sang backing vocals on this song, from album of same name. Also on the 1996 Billy Squier anthology Reach for the Sky.
1983: "Victory", "There Must Be More to Life Than This" and "State of Shock" were recorded by Mercury and Michael Jackson, but their original takes were never released. Demos and samples from the latter two have, however, turned up on bootlegs. Later, Mercury reworked "There Must Be More to Life Than This" into his solo album Mr. Bad Guy, and Jackson re-recorded "State of Shock" with Mick Jagger. Popular rumours dictate that a Queen version of "Victory" exists, but this has not surfaced anywhere yet. Queen's 2014 compilation Queen Forever included a brand new arrangement of "There Must Be More to Life Than This" featuring cuts from Jackson's vocal track.
1986: "Love Is the Hero" by Billy Squier – Mercury sang backing vocals on this song from the album Enough Is Enough. Mercury sings the intro on the 12" single, and also co-wrote and co-produced the track "Lady with a Tenor Sax", from the same album. Both also appear on the 1996 Billy Squier anthology Reach for the Sky.
1988: "Heaven for Everyone" by The Cross – Mercury sang lead vocals on the LP version, backing vocals on the single version (or the version on the US album) from the album Shove It.

Video albums

References

External links

Discography
Discographies of British artists
Rock music discographies